The Uri B. Curtis House–Tasker L. Oddie House, on Ellis St. in Tonopah, Nevada, United States, was built in 1902 and later enlarged.  It is listed on the U.S. National Register of Historic Places.  It was deemed significant for association with Tasker Lowndes Oddie, who was a lawyer and businessman and politician, eventually serving as governor of Nevada.

The house was partly built in the form of a pair of simple cabins by Uri B. Curtis, and was sold to Oddie in about 1904.  Oddie enlarged it by adding more cabins at right angles.  It was a modest residence that Oddie continued to reside in after becoming quite prominent.  The house was listed on the National Register of Historic Places in 1982.

See also 
Uri B. Curtis House, 169 Booker St., Tonopah, also NRHP-listed

References 

Houses completed in 1902
Houses on the National Register of Historic Places in Nevada
National Register of Historic Places in Tonopah, Nevada
Houses in Nye County, Nevada